The Crucible is a studio album by Norwegian rock band Motorpsycho, released on February 15, 2019, through Stickman Records and Rune Grammofon. This is the second installment in the band's Gullvåg Trilogy with the first installment being 2017's The Tower and the third  installment being 2020's The All Is One. The album is available as vinyl, CD and a digital download. Side A of the vinyl features the first two tracks 'Psychotzar' and 'Lux Aeterna' while Side B of the vinyl features the final titular track, which spans 20 minutes in length.

Track listing

Personnel
Motorpsycho
Bent Sæther – bass, vocals, guitar, Mellotron
Hans Magnus Ryan – guitar, vocals, piano
Tomas Järmyr – drums, percussion, vocals, Mellotron

Additional musicians
Lars Horntveth – reeds (2)
Susanna Wallumrød – vocals (2)

References

2019 albums
Motorpsycho albums